"The Wave" is a 2011 song by British rapper Sneakbo. The song was released in the United Kingdom on 21 October 2011 by Play Hard Records, reached to number 48 on the UK Singles Chart and was added to BBC Radio 1's B-List.

Music video
A music video to accompany the release of "Wave" was first released onto YouTube on 6 September 2011 at a total length of three minutes and thirty nine seconds.

Track listing

Chart performance

Weekly charts

Release history

References

2011 debut singles
Sneakbo songs
2011 songs